Harrington Junction was a railway junction in Harrington, Cumbria, England. No station ever existed at the junction,  was the nearest,  to the south.

Former employees described the junction as the CWJR's "nerve centre".

Background
The main line was one of the fruits of the rapid industrialisation of West Cumberland in the second half of the nineteenth century, specifically being born as a reaction to oligopolistic behaviour by the London and North Western and Whitehaven, Cleator and Egremont Railways.

All lines in the area were primarily aimed at mineral traffic, notably iron ore, coal and limestone, none more so than the new line to Workington, which earned the local name "The Track of the Ironmasters". General goods and passenger services were provided, but were very small beer compared with mineral traffic.

The founding Act of Parliament of June 1878 confirmed the company's agreement with the Furness Railway that the latter would operate the line for one third of the receipts.

Layout
Three lines joined the main line at Harrington Junction:

 the Derwent Branch, from Derwent Iron and Steel Works north west of the junction
 the Moss Bay Branch, from the Moss Bay Hematite Iron and Steel Company Works west of the junction, and
 the Harrington Branch, which met the Lowca Light Railway at Rosehill, south west of the junction.

The layout was such that trains could travel from the Harrington Branch onto the Moss Bay Branch or the Derwent Branch without going onto the main line.

There were five sidings on each side of the main line, four beside the lines to the steel works and a further four beside the Lowca line, together with other equipment such as cranes, signalboxes and a control cabin.

Growth
Mineral traffic started along the main line in July 1879, along with the branches towards Lowca and Derwent Ironworks. The Moss Bay branch followed in December 1885, being extended to Harrington Harbour in July 1893.

Harrington Junction was about mineral and industrial traffic. The line's peak year was 1909, with lots of traffic generated between 1914 and 1918.

In 1920 twenty "Up" (northbound) mineral trains halted at the junction, plus passenger, workmen's, goods, and special trains. A similar number travelled southbound.

Decline
Passenger traffic to and from Lowca ended in May 1926 and along the main line on 13 April 1931, though they had never been substantial.

The last remnant of the Derwent branch, from Wilkinson Wagon Works to the junction, closed in 1962.

The remaining main line from Calva Junction north of  through the junction to Distington closed on 26 September 1965, but residual traffic continued between Lowca and Moss Bay, keeping a bit of the junction alive.

The "Furnessman" brakevan railtour on 24 May 1969 passed through the remains of the junction.

Solway Colliery, Workington, closed in May 1973, leaving the junction with no traffic or prospect of traffic, so it closed on 23 May, with a farewell brakevan special on 26 May 1973 being the last train for ever.

Afterlife
In 2013 the West Cumbria Cycle Network used the main line trackbed through the junction.

See also

 Maryport and Carlisle Railway
 Furness Railway
 Whitehaven, Cleator and Egremont Railway
 Cockermouth and Workington Railway

References

Sources

Further reading

External links
Map of the CWJR with photos RAILSCOT
Map of the WC&ER with photos RAILSCOT
The junction and line in green Rail Map Online
The junction on overlain OS maps surveyed from 1898 National Library of Scotland
The junction and line railwaycodes
The railways of Cumbria Cumbrian Railways Association
Photos of Cumbrian railways Cumbrian Railways Association
The railways of Cumbria Railways_of_Cumbria
Cumbrian Industrial History Cumbria Industrial History Society
Furness Railtour using many West Cumberland lines 5 September 1954 sixbellsjunction
Furnessman railtour 24 May 1969 sixbellsjunction
Lowca Light Railway farewell railtour 26 May 1973 sixbellsjunction
A video tour-de-force of the region's closed lines cumbriafilmarchive
1882 RCH Diagram showing the station, see page 173 of the pdf google
Haematite earthminerals
Coal and iron ore mining in Cleator Moor Haig Pit
West Cumbria Cycle Network visitcumbria
The Harrington Branch and the Lowca Light Railway Cumbrian Railways Association

Rail junctions in England
Rail transport in Cumbria
1973 disestablishments in England